Theodor Franz Wilhelm Kirsch (29 September 1818, Düben, Torgau - 8 July 1889, Dresden) was a German entomologist who specialised in Coleoptera. 
 
Kirsch was curator of entomology at the Staatliches Museum für Tierkunde Dresden in Dresden.
 
His collection is shared between Upper Silesian Museum (Muzeum Górnośląskie w Bytomiu) in Bytom and Staatliches Museum für Tierkunde Dresden in Dresden. He described the birdwing butterfly Troides riedeli.

Works
Partial list
 1865 "Beiträge zur Käferfauna von Bogotá". Berliner Entomologische Zeitschrift. 9: 40-104. 
 1875 "Neue Käfer aus Malacca". Mitteilungen aus dem Koeniglichen Zoologischen Museum zu Dresden. 1: 3-34. 
 1876 "Beitrag zur Kenntnis der Coleopteren-fauna von Neu Guinea". Mitteilungen aus dem Koeniglichen Zoologischen Museum zu Dresden. 2: 137-161. 
 1876 "Beiträge zur Kenntniss der Lepidopteren-Fauna von Neu-Guinea"
1876 "Beiträge zur Kenntnis der peruanischen Käferfauna auf Dr. Abendroth's Sammlungen basirt". Deutsche Entomologische Zeitschrift. 20: 81-133. 
1883 "Neue südamerikanische Käfer". Berliner Entomologische Zeitschrift. 27: 187-213.

References
Anonym (1889). [Kirsch, Th. F. W.] Entomologist's Monthly Magazine. (3) 25 402.
Kraatz, G. (1889). [Kirsch, Th. F. W.] Deutsche Entomologische Zeitschrift. 8.

German lepidopterists
1818 births
1869 deaths
German curators
People from Torgau
19th-century German zoologists